Hayat Sher Pao Shaheed railway station is located in Hayat Sher Pao Shaheed village, Nowshera district of Khyber Pakhtunkhwa province of the Pakistan.

See also
 List of railway stations in Pakistan
 Pakistan Railways
 Hayat Sherpao

References

Railway stations in Nowshera District
Railway stations on Karachi–Peshawar Line (ML 1)